Michael "Mica" Gonçalves Pinto (born 4 June 1993) is a Luxembourger professional footballer who plays for Dutch club Sparta Rotterdam as a left-back. 

He spent the early part of his career in the Segunda Liga, mainly with Sporting CP B. He totalled 102 matches in the competition over five seasons, adding six appearances in the Primeira Liga for Belenenses. In January 2018, he signed with Dutch club Fortuna Sittard.

Pinto represented Portugal at youth level, before switching to Luxembourg in 2020.

Club career
Born in Diekirch, Luxembourg of Portuguese descent, Pinto joined Sporting CP's youth academy at the age of 14. He spent three full seasons with the reserve team in the Segunda Liga, making his debut in the competition on 11 August 2012 in a 1–0 away loss against U.D. Oliveirense and scoring his first goal on 24 February 2013 to help the hosts defeat S.C. Freamunde 5–1.

On 15 August 2015, Pinto was loaned to Spanish Segunda División B club Recreativo de Huelva alongside his teammates Kikas and Luís Ribeiro, with an option to buy. The following January, he terminated his contract alleging unpaid wages.

Pinto signed a permanent deal with C.F. Os Belenenses on 27 May 2016, with Sporting retaining 50% of his rights. He played his first match in the Primeira Liga on 19 August, coming on as a last-minute substitute in the 0–0 home draw with Boavista FC. Ahead of the 2017–18 campaign, he was loaned to C.F. União of the second tier.

In the January 2018 transfer window, Pinto agreed to a two-and-a-half-year contract at Fortuna Sittard of the Dutch Eerste Divisie. He contributed one goal from 14 appearances until the end of the season, as his side returned to the Eredivisie after a 16-year absence.

Pinto made his debut in the Dutch top flight on 11 August 2018, playing the entire 1–1 away draw against SBV Excelsior. On 30 December 2019, Sparta Rotterdam announced that he would be joining the club the following month, and he eventually signed a contract until June 2021 with the option of one more year.

International career
Also eligible to represent Luxembourg, Pinto appeared for Portugal at the 2013 FIFA U-20 World Cup held in Turkey. He started all four games during the tournament, which ended in round-of-16 exit.

Pinto made his full debut for Luxembourg in a friendly against Liechtenstein on 7 October 2020.

International goals
Scores and results list Luxembourg's goal tally first.

References

External links

National team data 

1993 births
Living people
People from Diekirch
Luxembourgian people of Portuguese descent
Portuguese footballers
Luxembourgian footballers
Association football defenders
Primeira Liga players
Liga Portugal 2 players
Sporting CP B players
C.F. Os Belenenses players
C.F. União players
Segunda División B players
Recreativo de Huelva players
Eredivisie players
Eerste Divisie players
Fortuna Sittard players
Sparta Rotterdam players
Portugal youth international footballers
Luxembourg international footballers
Portuguese expatriate footballers
Luxembourgian expatriate footballers
Expatriate footballers in France
Expatriate footballers in Spain
Expatriate footballers in the Netherlands
Portuguese expatriate sportspeople in France
Portuguese expatriate sportspeople in Spain	
Portuguese expatriate sportspeople in the Netherlands
Luxembourgian expatriate sportspeople in the Netherlands